Aham may refer to:

People
 Aham Okeke (born 1969), Nigerian-born Norwegian sprinter
 Aham Sharma, Indian film and television actor

Places
 Aham, Germany, municipality in Bavaria

Other
 Aham (Kashmir Shaivism)
 Aham (film)
 Association of Home Appliance Manufacturers